Melvin Jay "Mel" Hinich (April 29, 1939 – September 6, 2010)  was a professor of government and economics at the University of Texas at Austin. Hinich was also a research professor at UT's Applied Research Laboratories. Known as an expert in political science with a long record of distinction in a number of fields, he wrote seven books and published more than 200 papers in statistics/statistical theory, signal processing, economics, political science, biomedical engineering, pharmacy, and library science.

Biography
Hinich was born on April 29, 1939 in Pittsburgh, Pennsylvania. In 1966, he married Sonje Gregg and the couple had a daughter, Amy Leksana.

Education
Hinich attended Carnegie Institute of Technology where he earned a B.S. in Mathematics in 1959 as well as an M.S. in Mathematics in 1960. In 1963, he earned a Ph.D. in Statistics from Stanford University. Hinich's advisor while at Stanford was Herman Chernoff.

Editorial experience and professional affiliations
At various times throughout his career, Hinich served as editor for Macroeconomic Dynamics, Society for Nonlinear Dynamics and Econometrics, Journal of the American Statistical Association, and Journal of Mathematical Sociology. He became a fellow of the Institute of Mathematical Statistics in 1973, a fellow of the Public Choice Society in 1988, and was president of that organization from 1992-1994. Hinich was elected as a fellow of the American Statistical Association in 2002.

Academic influence
Michael Munger was reported to have been heavily influenced by Hinich.

Death
Hinich died on September 6, 2010 after falling down a staircase. He is survived by his wife and daughter.

Publications

Books
The Spatial Theory of Voting: An Introduction (with J. Enelow), Cambridge University Press, January (1984)
Advances in the Spatial Theory of Voting, J. Enelow and M. J. Hinich (eds.), Cambridge University Press (1990)
Political Economy: Institutions, Competition, and Representation, W. Barnett, M. J. Hinich, and N. J. Schofield (eds.), Cambridge University Press (1993).
Ideology and the Theory of Political Choice, (with M. C. Munger), University of Michigan Press, (1994)
Analytical Politics (with M.C. Munger) Cambridge University Press, (1997). 	Empirical Studies in Comparative Politics, (with M.C. Munger) Kluwer Academic Publishers,(1999)
Topics in Analytical Political Economy, M. J. Hinich and W. Barnett (editors), Elsevier, Oxford (2007)
Consumer Protection Legislation and the U. S. Food Industry (with R. Staelin), Pergamon Press, (1980).
Introduction to Continuous Probability Theory, (with K. D. MacKenzie), Charles E. Merrill Publishing Co., (1969).

Articles

References
General
Biography
Curriculum vitae
Specific

External links

1939 births
2010 deaths
Carnegie Mellon University alumni
Carnegie Mellon University faculty
Stanford University alumni
University of Texas at Austin faculty
Virginia Tech faculty
Scientists from Pittsburgh
Fellows of the American Statistical Association
Economists from Pennsylvania